Zanjirabad (also Romanized as Zanjīrābād) is a village in Almalu Rural District, Nazarkahrizi District, Hashtrud County, East Azerbaijan Province, Iran. As of the 2006 census, its population was 49, across 10 distinct families.

References 

Towns and villages in Hashtrud County